"Don't Gimme That" is a song written by Rory O'Connor for German group Aloha from Hell's 2009 debut album No More Days to Waste. It was released as the album's first single on June 6, 2008. The song reached number thirty and number eleven in the German and Austrian Singles Charts respectively.

Track listings
CD Single
"Don't Gimme That (Radio Version)" - 3:03
"Don't Gimme That (Alternative Rock Version)" - 3:20

CD Maxi Single
"Don't Gimme That (Radio Version)" - 3:03
"Don't Gimme That (Alternative Rock Version)" - 3:20
"Don't Gimme That (Private Room Remix)" - 3:08
"Fear Of Tomorrow" - 3:42

Charts

References

External links
Aloha From Hell's official website

Aloha from Hell songs
2008 debut singles
2008 songs